West Fourth Street Historic District is a registered historic district in downtown Cincinnati, Ohio, listed in the National Register of Historic Places on August 13, 1976.  It contained 32 contributing buildings when it was listed, but an additional building, 309 Vine Street, was added in a 2015 boundary increase.

A smaller, albeit older historic district, the East Fourth Street Historic District, lies several blocks to the east.

In the early part of the nineteenth century, Fourth Street was lined with exclusive mansions and an opera house.  Fourth Street has been an important financial center of the city since the late nineteenth century. Today, the historic district of the West section of Fourth Street is an increasingly residential area with luxury condos replacing commercial space.

The Lombardy Apartment Building and the Hooper Building are contributing properties to the historic district.

Notes 

Historic districts in Cincinnati
National Register of Historic Places in Cincinnati
Historic districts on the National Register of Historic Places in Ohio